Right Reverend Manuhuia "Manu" Augustus Bennett  (10 February 1916 – 20 December 2001) was a New Zealand Anglican Bishop in the second half of the 20th century.
He was born in Rotorua on 10 February 1916 into an ecclesiastical family: his father Frederick Augustus Bennett was the inaugural Bishop of Aotearoa. He identified with the Ngāti Whakaue, Ngāti Pikiao and Ngāti Rangitihi iwi. Educated at the University of Hawaiʻi and ordained in 1940, he was a Curate in the Diocese of Waiapu before becoming a Chaplain to the New Zealand Forces. When peace returned he was a Māori Missionary at Rangitīkei. Later he was Vicar of St Faith's Rotorua before being appointed Suffragan Bishop of Aotearoa in 1951. He was Bishop of Aotearoa from 1968 to 1981 and a member of the Waitangi Tribunal from 1986 to 1997. He died on 20 December 2001.

Honours and awards
In 1977, Bennett was awarded the Queen Elizabeth II Silver Jubilee Medal. In the 1981 Queen's Birthday Honours, he was appointed a Commander of the Order of St Michael and St George. On 6 February 1989, Bennett was the eleventh appointee to the Order of New Zealand. The following year, he was awarded the New Zealand 1990 Commemoration Medal.

Notes

1916 births
2001 deaths
20th-century Anglican bishops in New Zealand
People from Rotorua
University of Hawaiʻi at Mānoa alumni
Anglican bishops of Aotearoa
New Zealand military chaplains
World War II chaplains
New Zealand Companions of the Order of St Michael and St George
Members of the Order of New Zealand
Members of the Waitangi Tribunal